Macanudo is an Argentine daily comic strip by the cartoonist Liniers.  It has been published since 2002  in the newspaper La Nación.   It appears on the last page of the paper. Macanudo is published in newspapers and book collections in several countries, such as Brazil, Canada (Quebec), Czech Republic, and Italy. Since September 2018, the strip is distributed in English by King Features Syndicate.

Just like Liniers' previous strip, Bonjour, Macanudo is very experimental and deals with meta humor. It has been considered very popular.

Characters
Macanudo generally follows a nonlinear plot line, but several characters frequently recur:
Henrietta (Enriqueta), a little girl who reads a lot, and has a large imagination, her confidant Fellini, a sneaky black cat, and Mandelbaum (Madariaga), her teddy bear .
The Man who Translates Movie Titles.
Z-25, the sensitive robot.
The duendes (gnomes), a group of fantastic creatures often likened to cause superstitions.
Huberta and Gudrun, forest-dwelling witches.
Penguins, compared to humanity on several occasions.
Oliverio the Olive, 
The boy Martin (Martincito) and his imaginary friend Olga, a blue furry monster.
Yellow thing and Blue thing, two abstract beings that appear together
The Mysterious Man in Black
Liniers himself, both as a human and as an anthropomorphized rabbit
Lorenzo and Teresita, a human couple
Johnson and his friend Carlitos, a little blue bird
Pablo Picasso
La Guadalupe
Alfio, the troglodyte ball
The hermit from the mountain
José Luis, the unhappy man
The Cinephile Cow
Frogs
Aliens
Cows
"Gente que anda por ahi (People that wander around)", which may be considered a "segment" in which normal people named by their surnames perform normal activities.

Collected Works
Macanudo has been collected into 5 volumes published by Ediciones de la Flor:
Macanudo Nº1 which collects the strips from June 2002 to November 2003 (April 2004)
Macanudo Nº2 which collects strips published between 2003 and 2004 (April 2005)
Macanudo Nº3 (April 2006)
Macanudo Nº4 (December 2006)
Macanudo Nº5 (October 2007)
Later volumes are published by Editorial Común:
Macanudo Nº6 (2009)
Macanudo Nº7 (2010)
Macanudo Nº8 (2010)
Macanudo Nº9 (2012)
Macanudo Nº10 (2013)
Macanudo Nº11 (2015)
Macanudo Nº12 (2016)
Macanudo Nº13 (2017)

References

External links
 Macanudo in La Nación
 Ediciones de la Flor, the publishers of the collected volumes
 macanudo
 liniers
 Official website

Argentine comic strips
2002 comics debuts
Gag-a-day comics